Dollbergen is a railway station located in Dollbergen, in the municipality of Uetze in the German state of Lower Saxony. The station is located on the Berlin-Lehrte Railway. The train services are operated by Metronom.

Train services
The station is serves by the following service(s):

Regional services  Hannover - Lehrte - Gifhorn - Wolfsburg

References

Railway stations in Lower Saxony